Casanova & Co. is a 1977 fictional period comedy film starring Tony Curtis. It had many titles during its international release.

The action revolves around the adventures of Giacomo Casanova with various women, and takes place during the state visit to the Republic of Venice of the Middle-Eastern entourage of a mythical Caliph of Shiraz, anomalously dominated by his sexually hungry wife, styled Calipha.

Plot
While hiding from the royal authorities, Giacomo Casanova (Tony Curtis), the famous romancer, encounters his look-alike: Giacomino, a fugitive petty con man. Meanwhile, the Caliph and his wife arrive in Venice for a state visit, and she insists on a night with the legendary lover. Through a series of erotic encounters and mistaken-identity comedies, Giacomo and Giacomino make their way back to Venice for their appointment with the Caliph's wife.

Differing edits
The initial English-language export version was prepared under the title Casanova & Company and ran 100 minutes. When released in U.S. theatres by PRO International under the titles Some Like it Cool and Sex on the Run, some trimming was performed, a brief prologue depicting the present-day Las Vegas strip of casinos with a narrator comparing the impending story's events to high-stakes gambling was added, and the credits altered to feature just the retitling and the prime star names at the beginning, with the remainder of the previous title sequence placed at the end, sandwiched between closing credit frames. This version was subsequently released on VHS by Vestron Video (under their short-lived "Wanderlust Video" sub-label), and reissued in the 90s by Monterey. When the film was reissued on DVD in 2004 as The Amorous Mis-Adventures of Casanova, the Las Vegas intro was removed, a new videoburned title was placed at the front (with a new copyright line at the bottom of the frame), and the exit music was omitted, shortening the running time further.

Cast
Tony Curtis as Giacomino/Casanova
Jean Lefebvre as The Sergeant 
Marisa Berenson as The Caliph's Wife
Britt Ekland as Countess Trivulzi 
Sylva Koscina as The Prefect's Wife 
Hugh Griffith as The Caliph 
Umberto Orsini as Count Tiretta 
Marisa Mell as Duchess of Cornaro 
Andréa Ferréol as The Baker's Wife 
Victor Spinetti as The Prefect 
Jenny Arasse as Cecilia 
Jacques Herlin as Senator Dell'Acqua
Jeannie Bell as Fatme 
Lillian Müller as Beata 
Olivia Pascal as Angela 
Katia Christine as Sardella

Critical response

In a way, the United States title of Some Like It Cool was a piquant comment on the career of star Tony Curtis, whose stardom had chilled since his 1959 appearance in Some Like It Hot. This time around, Curtis plays famed 18th-century lover Giacomo Casanova. The plot would have us believe that Casanova has suddenly turned impotent, and is deploying all manner of subterfuge to hide the fact. One of Casanova's stratagems is to hire a look-alike (also Curtis) to uphold his reputation between the sheets. The stellar supporting cast — Marisa Berenson, Hugh Griffith, Britt Ekland et al. — seem far more embarrassed by their tawdry, topless surroundings than Curtis, who steamrolls his way through the film with the same dogged determination that he'd demonstrated in his "Yonda lies the castle of my fadduh" formative years.

Video releases
DVD release 5 October 2004

See also
Casanova's Big Night (1954)

References

External links

1977 comedy films
1977 films
Austrian comedy films
Italian comedy films
French comedy films
Films set in Venice
Films shot in Italy
Films about Giacomo Casanova
Films set in the 18th century
Cultural depictions of Giacomo Casanova
Films directed by Franz Antel
English-language French films
English-language Italian films
1970s Italian films
1970s French films